"Naked Idol" is the eighth and ninth episodes of the third season of the television series The Naked Brothers Band which premiered on March 14, 2009 on Nickelodeon. The episode is in the format of a rockumentary-mockumentary musical episode.

The premise of "Naked Idol" is that The Naked Brothers Band have a Naked Idol contest for a new bassist replacing Rosalina (Allie DiMeco). It also features guest appearances by David Desrosiers (Simple Plan) and Tobin Esperance (Papa Roach).

Plot
Rosalina comes back after her music cruise, but Michel (the  French guy Rosalina kissed on the cruise) also comes back, criticizes Nat's music, and kisses Rosalina which Nat sees. This causes a heated fight between Nat and Rosalina in which they break up and Rosalina quits the band.

So Nat and the band look all around the world, searching for a new bass player and meets some of the greatest musicians that ever lived. The band picks a girl named Kristina who is a great bass player and is really nice, but Nat isn't over Rosalina so he comes off a little mean in the beginning.

Soon Nat realizes that he doesn't want to go through the breakup alone and they all have a group hug and sing at their house. Rosalina then tells Michel that she is too good for him and leaves to go over to the Wolff's house.

The television movie special concludes with a cliff hanger. It ends just as Nat and Kristina start to bond, The band gets a call from Rosalina claiming that she wants to be back in the band.

Cast

References

External links
 
 

2009 American television episodes
The Naked Brothers Band (TV series) episodes